Aquatics at the 2005 East Asian Games in Macau, included competition in 3 disciplines:
Swimming (2–6 November); swum in a 50m pool (i.e. "long course meters")
Diving (30 October - 1 November)
Synchronized Swimming (3–5 November).

Swimming

Schedule

Prelims began at 9:00 a.m.; Finals at 7:00 p.m.
These Games marked the first time the 50s of stroke (50 back, 50 breast, 50 fly) were sum at the Games; consequently, new Games Records (GR) were established in each of these events.

Participating countries

Results

Men

Women

Medal table

Diving

Schedule

Results

Men

Women

Medal table

Synchronised swimming

Schedule

Results

Medal table

See also
Aquatics at the 2005 Southeast Asian Games

References

2005 in Asian sport
2005 East Asian Games
Swimming at the East Asian Games
2005 in water sports